Trinity College Dublin Students' Union (or TCDSU) is a students' union and the recognised representative body of the 17,000 students of Trinity College Dublin. Its role is to provide a representative channel between all students (undergraduates and postgraduates) and the authorities of the College as well as to provide services to these students. TCDSU is a constituent organisation of the Union of Students in Ireland.

The day-to-day business and affairs of the Union are run out of Mandela House and managed by the Sabbatical Officers and the Administrative Officer, together with members of the executive. The Sabbatical Officerships are: The President, Education Officer, Welfare Officer, Communications and Marketing Officer and Entertainments Officer (aka Ents Officer) and are elected on an annual basis; all capitated students are entitled to vote. The President, Welfare Officer and Education Officer are elected members of the College Board. The Education Officer and 3 Faculty Convenors are elected members of the University Council.

Services

Campaigns and Lobbying
The Union runs campaigns both internal and external of the College. Internal campaigns target students providing them with information on mental health or sexual health awareness. External campaigns are part of larger lobbying efforts targeting the Irish Government over issues such as the re-introduction of third-level fees. The Union also campaigns against decisions made by the College that are viewed as unfavourable to students.

Trinity Ents
The Ents Officer is responsible for running social events for members of the Union on and off campus under the brand Trinity Ents. The events are designed to be affordable to cater to the Union's student members.

Trinity Ents is responsible for the annual Trinity Ball, Europe's largest private music party annually drawing 8,000 party-goers. Until 2010, it was held annually on the last teaching day of Trinity term to celebrate the end of lectures and the beginning of Trinity Week. Due to a restructuring of the teaching terms of the College the Ball is now held on the last day of Trinity Week. It is a May Ball in the style of the Cambridge Colleges, with the emphasis on live music. The Ball is run in conjunction with Trinity's Central Societies Committee and  event promoters MCD Productions. The Ball has hosted acts such as The Kooks, Dizzee Rascal, Calvin Harris, Mark Ronson, Justice, and Babyshambles and celebrated its 50th anniversary in 2009.

The University Times

A student newspaper, The University Times, (formerly The University Record and known as Aontas before 1997), which exists separate of the college's Publications Committee, is published every three weeks during term by the Students' Union. Originally, the paper was edited by the Union's Communications Officer (or a delegate of their choice) with editorial independence from the Students' Union. As of the 2015/2016 academic year, the University Times Editor is a separately elected position, and the former Communications Officer is now known as the Communications and Marketing Officer. The University Times Editor is required to take an intermission of studies and receives their salary from the Union on a monthly basis, but is not considered to be an Officer of the Union, granting them editorial independence.

The University Times won the Newspaper of the Year award at the 2010, 2011 and 2012 National Student Media Awards.

Shops and café
TCDSU runs two shops in Trinity College, boosting the Union's income to fund other activities. A café, formerly known as the Junior Common Room (JCR) Café, is run in Goldsmith Hall. The Union previously operated a bookshop in Mandela House. This has since closed.

Officers

Notable former officers
 Joe Duffy - Former President and RTÉ broadcaster
 Ivana Bacik - Former President, Senator and Reid Professor of Law.
 Mark Little - Former President and RTÉ broadcaster
 Averil Power - Former President and Education Officer, Irish Government advisor and Fianna Fáil Seanad Spokesperson on Education 
 Lynn Ruane - Former President from 2015 to 2016, Senator.

References

External links
 Trinity Students' Union website
 The University Times  website
 Trinity Ents website
 Trinity Postgraduate Students' Ball

Students' unions in Ireland
Students' Union
Organisations based in Dublin (city)